The sixth World Masters Non-Stadia Athletics Championships were held in Riccione, Italy, from May 24-26, 2002. The World Masters Athletics Championships serve the division of the sport of athletics for people over 35 years of age, referred to as masters athletics.

References 

World Masters Athletics Championships
World Masters Athletics Championships
International athletics competitions hosted by Italy
2002